Qibao may refer to:

 Qibao, a town in the Minhang District of Shanghai, China
 Qibao Station:
 Qibao Station (Shanghai)
 Qibao Station (Hangzhou)
 Liu Qibao, a Chinese politician